Hotspur may refer to:

Football clubs
Holyhead Hotspur F.C.
Pietà Hotspurs F.C.
Tottenham Hotspur F.C.
Victoria Hotspurs F.C.

Vehicles
General Aircraft Hotspur, a WW2 glider
Hawker Hotspur, a WW2 fighter
Hotspur, British Railways class 7 "Britannia" locomotive 70011
HMS Hotspur, any of several British ships
Hotspur Land Rover, predecessor to the Land Rover Tangi, an armoured vehicle used by police in Northern Ireland

Other uses
 Hotspur, nickname of English knight Sir Henry Percy (1364–1403)
Sir Henry Percy as depicted in Shakespeare's Henry IV, Part 1
The Hotspur, a former British boys' comic
Hotspur, a three-issue Eclipse comic book series
Hotspur, Victoria, a locality in Australia

See also
Hornblower and the Hotspur, a Napoleonic naval warfare novel, centered on a fictional HMS Hotspur